The University of Defence (in Czech: Univerzita obrany, UO) is the only military institution of higher education of the Czech Armed Forces. Established as of 1 September 2004, it was formed by merging three existing institutions: Military Academy Brno (established in 1951), the Military University of the Ground Forces Vyškov (established in 1947) and the Military Medical Academy Hradec Králové (re-established in 1988).

Unlike public universities, as a state institution with limited authority the University of Defence is the only university-type school in the Czech Republic that is not a legal entity but an element in the Ministry of Defence structure. Thus, the rights of the Minister of Education towards the public universities are performed by the Minister of Defence.

University of Defence is responsible for education of military professionals and experts engaged in national security system, defence industry and public administration. The available Bachelor’s, Master’s and doctoral degree programmes, both in full- and part-time mode, focus on military and national security fields.

University of Defence represents the Army of the Czech Republic’s defence and security research and development centre. The fields of science fostered at the University of Defence primarily relate to defence applied research, to forces and population protection, or the economics or medicine fields applied to military. It is the only Czech institute where subjects such as weapons and ammunition, fighting vehicles, radars, population protection, fire support control, field surgery, radiobiology or toxicology are taught.

Faculties and other elements of the university 
The University of Defence consists of three faculties:
 Faculty of Military Leadership – Brno
 Faculty of Military Technology – Brno
 Faculty of Military Health Sciences – Hradec Králové

and an institute and three centres:
 NBC Defence Institute – Vyškov
 Security and Military Strategic Studies Centre - Brno
 Language Centre – Brno
 Physical Training and Sports Centre – Brno

External links 
 http://www.unob.cz/en

Military of the Czech Republic
2004 establishments in the Czech Republic
Universities and colleges formed by merger